This list of knots includes many alternative names for common knots and lashings. Knot names have evolved over time, and there are many conflicting or confusing naming issues. The overhand knot, for example, is also known as the thumb knot. The figure-eight knot is also known as the Savoy knot or the Flemish knot.

A

Adjustable Bend – can be easily lengthened or shortened
Adjustable Grip Hitch – a simple hitch which may easily be shifted up and down the rope while slack
Albright Special – used to tie two different diameters of line together, for instance to tie monofilament to braid
Alpine Butterfly (also known as Butterfly Loop) – a static loop mostly used by mountain climbers and rappellers for securing a carabiner to static rope.
Alternate Ring Hitching – covering a ring in hitching can prevent damage
Anchor Bend – attaching a rope to a ring or similar termination
Angler's Loop – knot which forms a fixed loop. Useful for fine or slippery line, it is one of the few loop knots which holds well in bungee cord.
Arbor Knot – attach fishing line to the arbor of a fishing reel
Artillery Loop a.k.a. a Manharness Knot – a knot with a loop on the bight for non-critical purposes
Ashley's Bend – used to securely join the ends of two ropes together
Ashley's Stopper Knot – trefoil-faced stopper at the end of the rope
Axle Hitch – used to tie a hitch in a hard-to-reach place

B

Bachmann knot –  friction hitch useful when the knot needs to be reset quickly/often
Bag knot (miller's knot) – binding knot used to secure the opening of a sack or bag
Bait loop (bumper knot) – secures soft or loose bait in fishing
Bale sling hitch – continuous loop of strap to form a cow hitch around an object
Barrel hitch (barrel sling) – suspends an object
Barrel knot (blood knot) – joins sections of monofilament nylon line while maintaining much of the line's inherent strength
Basket weave knot –  a family of bend and lanyard knots with a regular pattern
Becket hitch – any hitch made on an eye loop
Beer knot – bend used in tubular webbing as in slings used in rock climbing
Bimini twist – fishing knot used for offshore trolling and sportsfishing
Blackwall hitch – temporary means of attaching a rope to a hook
Blake's hitch – friction hitch commonly used by arborists and tree climbers as an ascending knot
 (Zeppelin bend)
Blood knot (barrel knot) – joins sections of monofilament nylon line while maintaining much of the line's inherent strength
Blood loop knot (dropper loop) – forms a loop which is off to the side of the line
Boa knot – binding knot
Boom hitch – attach a line to a fixed object like a pipe
Bottle sling (jug sling) – used to create a handle for a container with a narrow tapering neck
Bourchier knot – a variety of heraldic knot
Bowen knot (heraldic knot) – not a true knot (an unknot), a continuous loop of rope laid out as an upright square shape with loops at each of the four corners
Bowline – forms a fixed loop at the end of a rope
Boling knot (archaic term for the Bowline) – forms a fixed loop at the end of a rope

Bowline on a bight – makes a pair of fixed-size loops in the middle of a rope
Bumper knot – secures soft or loose bait in fishing
Bunny ears (double figure-eight loop)
Buntline hitch – attach a rope to an object
Butterfly bend – connects two ends of rope
Butterfly coil – a method for storing and transporting a climbing rope
Butterfly loop – forms a fixed loop in the middle of a rope

C

Carrick bend – joins two lines of heavy rope or cable
Carrick bend loop – used to make a loop at the end of a rope
Carrick mat – flat woven decorative knot which can be used as a mat or pad
Cat's paw – connects a rope to an object
Catshank – variant of the sheepshank, clinched by two overhand knots with the bights passed through the twists
Celtic button knot – a spherical decorative knot 
Chain sinnet – method of shortening a rope or other cable
Chain stitch – a sewing and embroidery technique in which a series of looped stitches form a chain-like pattern
Chair knot (Fireman's chair knot) – knot tied in the bight forming two adjustable, lockable loops
Chinese button knot – a decorative knot
Cleat hitch 
Clove hitch – two successive half-hitches around an object
Common whipping – series of knots intended to stop a rope from unraveling
Constrictor knot – one of the most effective binding knots
Continuous ring hitching (Ringbolt hitching) – series of identical hitches made around a ring
Corned beef knot – binding knot often used for binding the meat of the same name while it is being cooked
Cow hitch – hitch knot used to attach a rope to an object
Cow hitch and bowline (bale sling hitch or strap hitch) – uses a continuous loop of strap to form a cow hitch around an object in order to hoist or lower it
Cross constrictor knot – a variant of the Constrictor knot
Crown knot – a knot made in the strands of the end of a rope – the start of a back splice
Cowboy bowline – variation of the bowline loop knot

D

Diagonal lashing – lashing to bind spars or poles together to prevent racking
Diamond hitch – lashing technique used mainly in the field of equine packing, to secure a set of objects
Diamond knot (knife lanyard knot) – for forming a decorative loop on the end of a cord
Directional figure eight (inline figure-eight loop) – loop knot that can be made on the bight
Distel hitch – secure friction hitch used for rope climbing
Dogshank – variant of the sheepshank where the eyes formed at each end have the ends of the rope passed through
Donkey’s bane – variation on the diamond knot
Double anchorman knot – two or more pieces of rope joined together
Double bowline (round turn bowline) – loop knot that uses a round turn
Double carrick bend – join two lines together
Double constrictor knot – binding knot that can be difficult to untie once tightened
Double Englishman's knot (double fisherman's knot) – joins two lengths of rope

Double figure eight bend (Flemish bend) – joins two ropes of roughly similar size
Double figure-eight loop – forms two parallel loops
Double figure eight (stevedore knot) – bulky stopper knot often tied near the end of a rope that is secure-when-slack
Double fisherman's knot (grapevine knot) – joins two lengths of rope
Double loop (surgeon's loop) – for making loops at the end of lines similar to the Surgeon's knot, but with a double strand 
Double overhand knot – extension of the regular overhand knot, made with one additional pass
Double overhand noose – hitch knot used to bind a rope to a carabiner
Double pile hitch – attaches a rope to a pole or other structure

Double sheet bend – doubles a sheet bend by making an additional round turn below the first and again bringing the working end back under itself
Double windsor (for use in neckties) – method of tying a necktie around one's neck and collar
Dropper loop – forms a loop which is off to the side of the line
Dutch marine bowline (cowboy bowline) – variation of the bowline loop knot

E

Egg loop a.k.a. bumper knot – secures soft or loose bait in fishing applications

Englishman's knot (fisherman's knot) – a bend consisting of two overhand knots, each tied around the standing part of the other
Eskimo bowline – places a loop in the end of a rope

European death knot (one-sided overhand bend) – joins two ropes together
Eye splice – creates a permanent loop in the end of multi stranded rope by means of rope splicing

F

Falconer's knot – used in falconry to tether a bird of prey to a perch
Farmer's loop – midline loop knot made with a bight
Farrimond friction hitch – quick release adjustable friction hitch for use on lines under tension
Fiador knot – decorative, symmetrical knot used in equine applications
Figure-eight knot a.k.a. savoy knot, Flemish knot – type of knot created by a loop on the bight
Figure-eight loop – type of knot created by a loop on the bight
Figure-of-nine loop – forms a fixed loop in a rope
Fireman's chair knot – knot tied in the bight forming two adjustable, lockable loops
Fisherman's bend (anchor bend) – used for attaching a rope to a ring or similar termination
Fisherman's knot – knot for joining two lines with a symmetrical structure consisting of two overhand knots, each tied around the standing part of the other

Flemish bend – knot for joining two ropes of roughly similar size
Flemish knot a.k.a. figure-eight knot, savoy knot – knot for joining two ropes of roughly similar size
French bowline – variant of the bowline with two loops
Friendship knot – decorative square knot used to tie a neckerchief and in Chinese knotting
Friendship knot loop – a knot to tie a loop at the end of a rope

G

Garda hitch (alpine clutch) climbing knot that lets the rope move in only one direction
Girth hitch (cow hitch)
Good luck knot
Gordian knot – (mythical knot) an inextricable/complicated knot, tied by King Gordius of Phrygia, that Alexander the Great cut with a sword
Grantchester knot – a method of tying a necktie
Granny knot – secures a rope or line around an object
Grief knot – (what knot) combines features of granny knot and thief knot
Gripping sailor's hitch – used to tie one rope to another, or a rope to a pole, when the pull is lengthwise along the object
Ground-line hitch – attaches a rope to an object

H

Half blood knot (clinch knot) – for securing a fishing line to a fishing lure, snap or swivel
Half hitch – simple overhand knot, where the working end of a line is brought over and under the standing part
Half-Windsor knot – knot used for tying neckties
Halter hitch – connects a rope to an object
Halyard bend – a way to attach the end of a rope at right angle to a cylindrical object

Handcuff knot – tied in the bight, having two adjustable loops in opposing directions
Hangman's noose (hangman's knot) – well-known knot most often associated with its use in hanging a person
Harness bend – used to join two ropes together
Harness hitch (artillery loop) – knot with a loop on the bight for non-critical purposes
Heaving line knot
Heaving line bend – used to attach playing strings to the thick silk eyes of the anchorage knot
Highpoint hitch – used to attach a rope to an object
Highwayman's hitch – insecure, quick-release, draw loop hitch for trivial use
Hitching tie – simple knot used to tie off drawstring bags that allows quick access
Honda knot a.k.a. lariat loop – loop knot commonly used in a lasso
Hoxton knot – a method of arranging a scarf about the neck
Hunter's bend a.k.a. rigger's bend – joins two lines

I

Icicle hitch – excellent for connecting to a post when weight is applied to an end running parallel to the post in a specific direction
Improved clinch knot – used for securing a fishing line to the fishing lure
In-line figure-eight loop (directional figure eight) – loop knot that can be made on the bight
Italian hitch (Munter hitch) – simple knot commonly used by climbers and cavers as part of a life-lining or belay system

J

Jack Ketch's knot (hangman's knot) – well-known knot most often associated with its use in hanging a person
Jamming knot – for constricting a bundle of objects
Jug sling a.k.a. bottle sling – used to create a handle for a glass or ceramic container with a slippery, narrow, tapering neck
Jury mast knot – for jury rigging a temporary mast on a sailboat or ship

K

Karash double loop – A knot used to form leg loops as a makeshift harness
Killick hitch – hitch knot used to attach a rope to oddly shaped objects
Klemheist knot – friction hitch that grips a rope when weight is applied, and is free to move when the weight is released
Knot of isis – ancient Egyptian symbol of the goddess Isis; similar to a knot used to secure the garments that the Egyptian gods  wore
Knotless knot
Knute hitch

L

Lariat loop a.k.a. honda knot – loop knot commonly used in a lasso
Lark's foot (Lark's head, cow hitch) used to attach a rope to an object
Lapp knot
Left-hand bowline (cowboy bowline) – variation of the bowline loop knot
Ligature knot a.k.a. surgeon's knot – simple modification to the reef knot that adds an extra twist when tying the first throw
Lighterman's hitch (tugboat hitch) – ideal for heavy towing, or making fast to a post, bollard, or winch
Lineman's loop (butterfly loop) – used to form a fixed loop in the middle of a rope
Lissajous knot – knot defined by parametric equations
Lobster buoy hitch – similar to the buntline hitch, but made with a cow hitch around the standing part rather than a clove hitch

M

Magnus hitch (rolling hitch) – used to attach a rope to a rod, pole, or other rope
Manharness knot (artillery loop) – knot with a loop on the bight for non-critical purposes
Matthew Walker knot – decorative knot that is used to keep the end of a rope from fraying
Marlinespike hitch – temporary knot used to attach a rod to a rope in order to form a handle

Midshipman's hitch – similar to the (taut-line hitch) – adjustable loop knot for use on lines under tension
Miller's knot – binding knot used to secure the opening of a sack or bag
Monkey's fist – looks somewhat like a small bunched fist/paw, most often used as the weight in a heaving line
Mountaineer's coil – method used by climbers for carrying a rope
Munter hitch – simple knot commonly used by climbers and cavers as part of a life-lining or belay system

N

Nail knot – used in fly fishing to attach the leader to the fly line
Noose – loop at the end of a rope in which the knot slides to make the loop collapsible

O

Offset figure-eight bend – a poor knot that has been implicated in the deaths of several rock climbers
One-sided overhand bend – used to join two ropes together
Ossel hitch – used to attach a rope or line to an object
Overhand bend – used to join two ropes together
Overhand knot a.k.a. thumb knot – fundamental knot that forms the basis of many others
Overhand knot with draw-loop – knot in which the weight of the load depresses the loop to keep it in place
Overhand loop – forms a fixed loop in a rope
Overhand noose
Oysterman's stopper knot (Ashley's stopper knot) –  trefoil-faced stopper at the end of the rope

P

Packer's knot – binding knot which is easily pulled taut and quickly locked in position
Palomar knot – used for securing a fishing line to a fishing lure, snap or swivel
Pan Chang knot
Pile hitch – used for attaching rope to a pole or other structure
Pipe hitch – hitch-type knot used to secure pipes/poles
Plafond knot
Poldo tackle – an instant tension-applying and tension-releasing mechanism in rope
Pratt knot – a method of tying a tie around one's neck and collar
Pretzel link knot – in knot theory, a branch of mathematics, a pretzel link is a special kind of link
Prusik knot – friction hitch or knot used to put a loop of cord around a rope
Portuguese bowline a.k.a. French bowline – variant of the bowline with two loops that are adjustable in size
Portuguese whipping – a type of whipping knot
Power cinch (trucker's hitch) – commonly used for securing loads on trucks or trailers

Q

Quick-release knot (Highwayman's hitch) – insecure, quick-release, draw loop hitch for trivial use

R

Racking bend – knot for joining two ropes of different diameter
Radium release hitch
Reef knot – simple binding knot used to secure a rope or line around an object
Reever Knot – a secure and compact bend for joining two lines
Rigger's bend a.k.a. Hunter's bend – used to join two lines
Rigid double splayed loop in the bight – knot that contains two parallel loops
Ringbolt hitching
Ring bend (water knot) – for joining two ends of webbing together
Ring hitch (cow hitch) – used to attach a rope to an object
Rolling hitch – knot used to attach a rope to a rod, pole, or other rope
Rose knot – decorative stopper knot
Rosendahl bend (Zeppelin bend) – general purpose bend knot unique in the ease with which it is untied, even after heavy loading
Round lashing
Round turn and two half-hitches – hitch used to secure the end of a rope to a fixed object
Round turn
Running bowline
Running highwayman's hitch
Running knot (slip knot) – knots which attach a line to an object and tighten when tension is applied to the free end of the line

S

Sailor's hitch – a secure, jam-proof hitch
Sailor's knot a.k.a. carrick bend – used for joining two lines
Savoy knot a.k.a. figure-eight knot, Flemish knot – decorative, heraldic knot 
Shear lashing
Sheepshank – used to shorten or store rope
Sheet bend – joins two ropes together
Shoelace knot – commonly used for tying shoelaces and bow-ties
Shroud knot – a multi-strand bend knot used to join two ends of laid (or twisted) rope together
Siberian hitch – used to attach a rope to an object
Simple knot – (four-in-hand knot) a method of tying a necktie
Simple Simon under – used for joining two lines
Single carrick bend – refers to different knots similar to the Carrick bend
Single hitch – an overhand knot tied around or through an object

Slip knot – knots which attach a line to an object and tighten when tension is applied; a type of knot designed to bind one end of a rope to the middle of another
Slipped buntline hitch – used for attaching a rope to an object
Slipped half hitch – temporary attachment of rope to object
Slippery eight loop – adjustable loop knot
Slippery hitch – used to attach a line to a rod or bar
Snell knot – a hitch knot used to attach an eyed fishing hook to fishing line
Snuggle hitch – a modification of the clove hitch
Span loop – non-jamming loop that can be tied in the middle of a rope
Spanish bowline – double loop knot
Splice – the forming of a semi-permanent joint between two ropes
  Square knot (American usage) or reef knot (British usage) – used to secure a rope or line around an object
Square lashing – used to bind poles together
Square Turk's head – decorative knot with a variable number of interwoven strands, forming a closed loop
Stein knot – variation of the Figure-eight knot
Stevedore knot – a stopper knot often tied near the end of a rope
Strangle knot – a simple binding knot
Strap hitch (bale sling hitch) – uses a continuous loop of strap to form a cow hitch around an object
Surgeon's knot a.k.a. ligature knot – modification to the reef knot
Surgeon's loop – similar to the surgeon's knot but with a double strand
Swing hitch

T

Tape knot (water knot) – frequently used in climbing for joining two ends of webbing together 
Tarbuck knot – used by climbers and was primarily used with stranded nylon rope
Taut-line hitch – adjustable loop knot for use on lines under tension
Tensionless hitch – an anchor knot used for rappelling or rope rescue. 
Tent hitch (taut-line hitch) – adjustable loop knot for use on lines under tension
Thief knot – resembles the reef knot except that the free, or working, ends are on opposite sides
Threefoil knot – another term for a trefoil knot
Thumb knot a.k.a. overhand knot – one of the most fundamental knots and forms the basis of many others
Timber hitch – used to attach a single length of rope to a cylindrical object
Tom fool's knot – good knot with which to commence a slightly fancy sheepshank
Transom knot – to secure two linear objects, such as spars, at right angles to each other
Trefoil knot – simplest example of a nontrivial knot in mathematics
Trident loop – fixed loop knot
Trilene knot – a multi purpose fishing knot
Triple bowline – variation of the bowline knot that is used to create three loops on one knot simultaneously
Triple crown knot – non-communicating double loop knot.  It is secure and symmetrical, but can jam when tightened.
Triple fisherman's knot – a bend knot used to join two ends of rope together
Trucker's hitch – used for securing loads on trucks or trailers
True lover's knot – a name which has been used for many distinct knots
Tugboat hitch – ideal for heavy towing, or making fast to a post, bollard, or winch
Turle knot – used while fishing for tying a hook or fly to a leader
Twined Turk's head – decorative knot with a variable number of interwoven strands forming a closed loop
Tumble hitch
Two half-hitches – an overhand knot tied around a post, followed by a half-hitch
Two strand overhand knot (one-sided overhand bend) – used to join two ropes together

U

Underhand knot – another name for a trefoil knot
Underwriter's knot 
Uni knot – fishing knot used to attach fishing line to the arbor of a reel

V

Versatackle knot – simulates a block and tackle without actual pulleys or deadeyes
Vibration-proof hitch – used for fastening a line or rope to a solid object

W

Wagoner's hitch – compound knot commonly used for securing loads on trucks or trailers
Wall knot
Wall and crown knot – used at the end of the ropes on either side of a gangway leading onto a ship
Water bowline – type of knot designed for use in wet conditions where other knots may slip or jam
Water knot – frequently used in climbing for joining two ends of webbing together
Waterman's knot – a bend with a symmetrical structure consisting of two overhand knots, each tied around the standing part of the other
West Country whipping – uses twine to secure the end of a rope to prevent it fraying
Windsor knot – a symmetrical knot used for tying a necktie around one's neck and collar

Y
Yosemite bowline – a medium security loop knot

Z
Zeppelin bend – a secure, easily tied, and a jam-proof way to connect two ropes
Zeppelin loop – (Rosendahl Loop) a secure, jam-resistant end loop

Sub-lists, by type
List of bend knots
List of binding knots
List of climbing knots
List of coil knots
List of decorative knots
List of hitch knots
List of friction hitch knots
List of loop knots
List of slip knots
List of splices
List of stopper knots
List of trick knots

See also 
List of knot terminology
List of mathematical knots and links
The Ashley Book of Knots

References 

Technology-related lists